Nathan Turvey (born 17 October 1977) is a former Australian rules footballer who played with Hawthorn in the Australian Football League (AFL).

Hawthorn selected Turvey in the 1996 AFL Draft from South Fremantle in the West Australian Football League (WAFL) with the 29th overall selection.  He only played three games for Hawthorn in his first season due to finger tendon injuries.  After only seven more games in 1999, the long-kicking left footer was delisted by Hawthorn prior to the 2000 season.

After a year in South Australia playing for South Adelaide, Turvey then returned to Western Australian where he continued to play for South Fremantle until 2003.  He is also a highly rated harness racing trainer and driver, based in Narrogin, Western Australia.

References

External links

1977 births
Living people
Australian rules footballers from Western Australia
Hawthorn Football Club players
South Fremantle Football Club players
South Adelaide Football Club players
Australian horse trainers
Australian harness racers